Mohammad-Reza Shajarian (23 September 1940 – 8 October 2020) was an Iranian singer, musician, composer and calligrapher.

Albums

Studio albums

 Robaeiat-e Khayyam (1972)
 Chavosh 1 (Be Yad-e Aref)]] (1977)
 Golbang-e Shajarian (1978)
 Chavosh 2 (1978)
 Sepideh (Chavosh 6)]] (1979)
 Chavosh 7 (1979)
 Jan Jan (album) (Chavosh 9)]] (1979)
 Raz-e Del (1979)
 Entezar-e Del (1979)
 Peyvand-e Mehr (1984)
 Astan-e Janan (1985)
 Bidad (1985)
 Serr-e Eshgh (Mahoor) (1986)
 Nava, Morakabkhani (1986)
 Dastan (album) (1988)
 Saz-e Ghese Goo (1988)
 Dood-e Ood (1989)
 Del-e Majnoon (1990–1991)
 Khalvatgozideh (1991)
 Payam-e Nasim (1991)
 Sarv Chaman (1991)
 Asman-e Eshgh (1991)
 Delshodegan (1992)
 Yad-e Ayyam (1992)
 Cheshmeye Noosh (1993)
 Bahariyeh (album) (1994)
 Gonbad-e Mina (1994)
 Jan-e Oshagh (1995)
 Peygham-e Ahl-e Del (1995)
 Dar Khial (1996)
 Rosvaye Del (1996)
 Eshgh Danad (1997)
 Shab-e Vasl (1997)
 Moamaye Hasti (1997)
 Chehreh Be Chehreh (1998)
 Shab, Sokout, Kavir (1998)
 Aram-e Jan (1998)
 Ahang-e Vafa (1999)
 Booye Baran (1999)
 Zemestan Ast (2001)
 Bi To Besar Nemishavad (2002)
 Faryad (2002)
 Hamnava Ba Bam (2003)
 Jam-e Tohi (2004)
 Saz-e Khamoosh (2007)
 Sorood-e Mehr (2007)
 Ghoghaye Eshghbazan (2007)
 Konsert-e Mohammad-Reza Shajarian Va Gorooh-e Ava (2008)
 Konsert-e Mohammad-Reza Shajarian Va Gorooh-e Shahnaz (Randan-e Mast Va Morgh-e Khoshkhan) (2008)
 Ah Baran (2009)
 Zaban-e Atash (2009)
 Randan-e Mast (2009)
 Konsert-e Mohammad-Reza Shajarian Va Gorooh-e Shahnaz Dar Dubai (2010)
 Morgh-e Khoshkhan (2011)
 Ranghaye Taali (2013)
 Tarigh-e Eshgh (2016)
 Khorasaniat (2019)
 Deylaman (album) (Unknown date)

Live
 Iran: Dastgah chahargah

Soundtrack
 Delshodegan

Single
 2019	Bote Man / Nargese Jadoo
 2019	Delroba
 2019	Gholame Cheshm
 2019	Nedaye Eshgh
 2020	Dream
 2020	Autumn
 2020	Broken Heart
 2020	Hich
 2020	Khorasaniat
 2020	YashT

References

External links
Official website

Mohammad Reza Shajarian